= 2023 Rapid City mayoral election =

- June 6, 2023

Candidate	Jason Salamun	Laura Armstrong
Party	Nonpartisan	Nonpartisan
Popular vote	4,888	4,619
Percentage	31.69%	29.94%
Candidate	Ron Weifenbach	Brad Estes
Party	Nonpartisan	Nonpartisan
Popular vote	2,999	2,769
Percentage	19.44%	17.95%
Mayor before election
Steve Allender
Nonpartisan
Elected mayor
Jason Salamun
Nonpartisan

The 2023 Rapid City mayoral election took place on June 6, 2023. Incumbent Mayor Steve Allender declined to seek re-election to a fourth term. A crowded field emerged to succeed Allender, with three members of the city council all announcing campaigns. City Councilmember Jason Salamun narrowly won the election, receiving 32 percent of the vote to fellow Councilmember Laura Armstrong's 30 percent, a difference of 269 votes. After the election, Armstrong requested a recount, which confirmed Salamun's win.

After Salamun's plurality victory, he moved to restore runoff elections to municipal elections, which were abolished in 2019.

== Candidates ==
- Jason Salamun, City Councilmember
- Laura Armstrong, City Councilmember
- Ron Weifenbach, City Councilmember
- Brad Estes, real estate broker
- Josh Lyle, businessman

== Results ==
2023 Rapid City mayoral election
Party	Candidate	Votes	%
Nonpartisan	Jason Salamun	4,888	31.69%
Nonpartisan	Laura Armstrong	4,619	29.94%
Nonpartisan	Ron Weifenbach	2,999	19.44%
Nonpartisan	Brad Estes	2,769	17.95%
Nonpartisan	Josh Lyle	150	0.97%
Total votes		15,425	100.00%
